As of 2022, China is the world's most populous country. According to Demographia, in 2017 there were 102 Chinese cities with over 1 million people in the "urban area", as defined by the group's methodology.

Definition and classification 
According to the administrative divisions of China, there are three levels of cities, namely direct-administered municipalities, prefecture-level cities, and county-level cities. The Special Administrative Regions of Hong Kong and Macau are not included in this administrative classification.

Municipalities and prefecture-level cities are not each a 'city' in the strictest sense of the term, but instead an administrative unit comprising, typically, both the urban core (a city in the strict sense) and surrounding rural or less-urbanized areas.

Prefecture-level cities nearly always contain multiple counties, county-level cities, and other such sub-divisions. To distinguish a prefecture-level city from its actual urban area (city in the strict sense), the term "" (shì qū; "urban area") is used. Thus, the "urban core" would be roughly comparable to the American term "city limit", the "shì qū", or "urban area", would be roughly comparable to "metropolitan area", and the municipality is a political designation defining regions under control of a municipal government, which has no comparable designation.

List of major cities by population

Urban population

Locations of the 50 most populous cities in Mainland China

Cities and towns by population 

 China cities and towns by urban population (2020-2021) 

1.Shanghai - 24,890,000
2.Beijing - 21,893,095
3.Guangzhou - 18,810,600
4.Chengdu - 16,935,567
5.Chongqing - 16,875,000
6.Shenzhen - 14,678,000
7.Tianjin - 13,866,009
8.Wuhan - 12,326,500
9.Xi'an - 11,904,805
10.Hangzhou - 10,711,238
11.Dongguan - 10,466,625
12.Foshan - 9,498,863
13.Nanjing - 9,314,685
14.Jinan - 8,352,574
15.Shenyang - 7,885,142
16.Qingdao - 7,172,451
17.Harbin - 6,976,136
18.Zhengzhou - 6,650,532
19.Changsha - 5,980,707
20.Kunming - 5,950,578
21.Dalian - 5,736,383
22.Changchun - 5,691,024
23.Xiamen - 5,163,970
24.Ningbo - 5,057,140
25.Taiyuan - 4,529,141
26.Zhongshan - 4,418,060
27.Ürümqi - 4,335,017
28.Suzhou - 4,330,000
29.Shantou - 4,312,192
30.Hefei - 4,216,940
31.Shijiazhuang - 4,098,243
32.Fuzhou - 4,094,491
33.Nanning - 3,839,800
34.Wenzhou - 3,604,446
35.Changzhou - 3,601,079
36.Nanchang - 3,576,547
37.Guiyang - 3,483,100
38.Tangshan - 3,399,231
39.Wuxi - 3,256,000
40.Lanzhou - 3,072,100
41.Handan - 2,845,790
42.Hohhot - 2,681,758
43.Weifang - 2,659,938
44.Jiangmen - 2,657,662
45.Zibo - 2,640,000
46.Huai'an - 2,632,788
47.Xuzhou - 2,623,066
48.Maoming - 2,539,148
49.Shaoxing - 2,521,964
50.Yantai - 2,511,053
51.Huizhou - 2,509,243
52.Zhuhai - 2,439,585
53.Luoyang - 2,372,571
54.Linyi - 2,303,648
55.Nantong - 2,273,326
56.Haikou - 2,250,000
57.Baotou - 2,181,077
58.Liuzhou - 2,153,419
59.Datong - 2,030,203
60.Putian - 2,003,000
61.Lianyungang - 2,001,009
62.Baoding - 1,976,000
63.Xining - 1,954,795
64.Zhanjiang - 1,931,455
65.Wuhu - 1,870,000
66.Chaozhou - 1,750,945
67.Qingyuan - 1,738,424
68.Tai'an - 1,735,425
69.Yichang - 1,698,400
70.Yangzhou - 1,665,000
71.Yinchuan - 1,662,968
72.Xiangyang - 1,658,000
73.Anshan - 1,647,000
74.Jilin City - 1,623,000
75.Yancheng - 1,615,717
76.Taizhou - 1,607,108
77.Qinhuangdao - 1,586,000
78.Ganzhou - 1,585,000
79.Daqing - 1,574,389
80.Guilin - 1,572,300
81.Huzhou - 1,558,826
82.Zhaoqing - 1,553,109
83.Jiaxing - 1,518,654
84.Jining - 1,518,000
85.Jinhua - 1,463,990
86.Changde - 1,457,519
87.Hengyang - 1,453,000
88.Suqian - 1,440,000
89.Baoji - 1,437,802
90.Zhangjiakou - 1,435,000
91.Mianyang - 1,355,331
92.Qiqihar - 1,350,434
93.Heze - 1,346,717
94.Fushun - 1,307,200
95.Yangjiang - 1,292,987
96.Liaocheng - 1,229,768
97.Tianshui - 1,212,791
98.Benxi - 1,176,490
99.Chifeng - 1,175,391
100.Jiujiang - 1,164,268
101.Anyang - 1,146,839
102.Huaibei - 1,142,000
103.Yulin - 1,117,800
104.Xinxiang - 1,047,088
105.Shaoguan - 1,028,460
106.Dongying - 998,968
107.Luzhou - 998,900
108.Meizhou - 992,351
109.Leshan - 987,000 
110.Dezhou - 986,192
111.Xingtai - 971,300
112.Chenzhou - 960,000
113.Mudanjiang - 930,105
114.Tongliao - 921,808
115.Chengde - 920,395
116.Laiwu - 907,839
117.Taishan - 907,354
118.Quzhou - 902,767
119.Zhoushan - 882,932
120.Suihua - 877,114
121.Langfang - 868,066
122.Hengshui - 856,705
123.Yingkou - 848,100
124.Panjin - 846,500
125.Weihai - 844,310
126.Anqing - 804,493
127.Liaoyang - 793,700
128.Puyang - 760,300
129.Fuxin - 759,100
130.Jieyang - 741,674
131.Yangquan - 731,228
132.Jiamusi - 726,622
133.Huludao - 724,800
134.Zhumadian - 721,670
135.Kashgar - 711,300
136.Dazhou - 705,321
137.Heyuan - 703,607
138.Longyan - 703,524
139.Aksu City - 695,000
140.Ordos City - 693,038
141.Hegang - 690,000
142.Binzhou - 682,717
143.Siping - 680,600
144.Sanmenxia - 669,307
145.Dandong - 659,400
146.Suining - 658,798
147.Sanya - 644,727
148.Ji'an - 643,399
149.Cangzhou - 621,300
150.Qitaihe - 620,935
151.Yichun - 598,000
152.Tonghua - 584,209
153.Jixi - 580,000
154.Korla - 549,324
155.Chaoyang - 537,800
156.Dingxi - 525,044
157.Shuangyashan - 507,257
158.Songyuan - 495,900
159.Nanping - 491,287
160.Liaoyuan - 475,400
161.Lhasa - 464,736
162.Karamay - 462,347
163.Shanwei - 437,000
164.Tieling - 434,799
165.Suihua - 428,795
166.Ulanqab - 425,059
167.Hami - 412,305
168.Huangshan City - 410,973
169.Hotan - 408,894
170.Wuwei - 408,000
171.Baishan - 402,600
172.Sanming - 379,701
173.Yunfu - 369,321
174.Hailar - 365,012
175.Zhaotong - 352,831
176.Ningde - 343,262
177.Baicheng - 332,826
178.Hunchun - 271,000
179.Zhangjiajie - 225,700
180.Golmud - 205,700
181.Yumen City - 168,300
182.Altay City - 114,995

See also 

 List of capitals in China
 List of cities in China
 List of largest cities in the world
 List of urban areas in China
 List of villages in China

References

External links 
 National Bureau of Statistics of China official website
 Mongabay.com: Largest Cities in China (unofficial)

Population
 x
China
China, Population
China
Populated places in China